Halcyone Barnes (March 31, 1913 – April 9, 1988) was an American collage artist and watercolor painter.

Life
Barnes was born on March 31, 1913, in Dallas, Texas.

Barnes became a collage artist and watercolor painter. In the 1960s, she exhibited her artwork with Bess Phipps Dawson and Ruth Atkinson Holmes; the three women artists became known as the "Summit Trio". The three housewives were trained by Roy Schultz at Summit Junior College.

Barnes married Joe Barnes. She died on April 9, 1988, in Summit, at age 75, and she was buried in Woodlawn Cemetery.

References

1913 births
1988 deaths
Artists from Dallas
People from Summit, Mississippi
American collage artists
Women collage artists
American watercolorists
American women painters
Artists from Mississippi
Women watercolorists
20th-century American painters
20th-century American women artists